Was I the Wave? is the second studio album by Miracle Fortress, released on April 26, 2011. The album departs from the indie rock of Five Roses, and is instead more of an electronic offering. As with Five Roses, all songs were composed, arranged, performed, produced, and engineered by Graham Van Pelt. For live performances, Van Pelt is accompanied on-stage by fellow Think About Life bandmate Greg Napier.

Reception

On its release, the album received a favourable review in the Montreal Gazette from Bernard Perusse, garnering a rating of 4 out of 5 stars.

The album was named as a longlisted nominee for the 2011 Polaris Music Prize.

Track listing
"Awe" - 2:33
"Tracers" - 4:48
"Raw Spectacle" - 6:01
"Wave" - 1:34
"Spectre" - 5:13
"Everything Works" - 4:01
"Before" - 1:40
"Miscalculations" 5:27
"Immanent Domain" - 5:51
"Until" - 1:58

Personnel
 Graham Van Pelt
 Greg Napier - live performances only

References

External links
 Miracle Fortress site
 Secret City Records album page for Was I the Wave?

2011 albums
Miracle Fortress albums